George Peter Wilbur (March 6, 1941 – February 1, 2023) was an American actor and professional stuntman.

Early life 
Wilbur was born in Connecticut and served in the United States Navy. He worked as a wrangler on a ranch in Tucson, Arizona, where he worked as an extra in the 1966 film El Dorado and was recruited as a stand-in performer for John Wayne. Wilbur later moved to California, where he worked as an extra and stunt double.

Career
Wilbur played Michael Myers in Halloween 4: The Return of Michael Myers and Halloween: The Curse of Michael Myers. He was credited as a stunt player in Halloween 5: The Revenge of Michael Myers, another Halloween sequel, although not in the role of Michael Myers as actor and stuntman Don Shanks played the role. His career as a stuntman lasted for 40 years and involved over 100 television and film projects. He was a member of the Hollywood Stuntmen's Hall of Fame.

Death
Wilbur died on February 1, 2023.

Filmography

Film

Television

Video games

References

External links

1941 births
2023 deaths
American male film actors
American stunt performers
20th-century American male actors
Male actors from Connecticut
Military personnel from Connecticut